Morteza Ebrahimi (born March 6, 1982) is a retired Iranian footballer who played in the IPL. He currently works as a youth coach for Charlotte Soccer Academy and is the head coach for National Premier Soccer League club Charlottetown Hops FC.

Club career
He started his career with Esteghlal Rasht youth team in 1998. In 2005, he joined Esteghlal F.C. which became IPL Champions in the 2005–06 season.

Club career statistics

Coaching
In February 2023, Ebrahimi was named head coach of National Premier Soccer League expansion club Charlottetown Hops FC.

Honours
Iran Pro League
Winner: 1
2005–06 with Esteghlal

References

External links

1982 births
Living people
Persian Gulf Pro League players
Pegah Gilan players
Sanat Mes Kerman F.C. players
Saipa F.C. players
Damash Gilan players
Esteghlal F.C. players
Iranian footballers
Association football defenders
People from Rasht
Sportspeople from Gilan province
National Premier Soccer League coaches
Iranian football managers
Iranian expatriate football managers
Iranian expatriate sportspeople in the United States
Expatriate soccer managers in the United States